Bökhiin Örgöö or Bokhiin Orgoo (Бөхийн Өргөө), literally meaning "Wrestling Palace" in the Mongolian language, is a sports complex (arena) in Ulaanbaatar, Mongolia that is home to the Mongolian wrestling competitions and also hosts music concerts under a lease.

Sport in Mongolia
Buildings and structures in Ulaanbaatar